In mathematics, a product of groups usually refers to a direct product of groups, but may also mean:
semidirect product
Product of group subsets
wreath product
free product
central product